John Bettes may refer to:
 John Bettes the Elder  (active c. 1531–1570) English artist whose few known paintings date from between about 1543 and 1550
 John Bettes the Younger (died 1616) English portrait painter and son of John Bettes the Elder